Saudi Arabia has not officially maintained and possessed weapons of mass destruction (WMD). In 1972 Saudi Arabia signed and approved the convention on the prohibition of the development, production and stockpiling of biological (bacteriological) and toxin weapons. Nevertheless, Saudi Arabia has made steps towards a nuclear program and according to some observations, they can be used to develop nuclear weapons. According to some reports, Riyadh has an alleged deal with Pakistan regarding nuclear weapons projects.

In 2018 Crown Prince Mohammad bin Salman confirmed on 60 Minutes that Saudi Arabia would develop nuclear weapons if Iran successfully detonated one, causing widespread distrust of the Saudi Arabian nuclear program.

Background 

Saudi Arabia officially is a non-nuclear-weapon state party to the Treaty on the Non-Proliferation of Nuclear Weapons, and it has also an agreement with the International Atomic Energy Agency. Riyadh has been accused of following nuclear, despite being a follower of IAEA,  NPT and OPCW.

Nuclear foundations 
Riyadh officials had travels to France and Russia and signed several transactions, among establishment of atomic foundations in Saudi Arabia. Riyadh is pursuing its open negotiations about establishment of atomic foundations in front of media. Despite that, it has been secretly looking for the establishment of a scientific atomic center by the co-operation of Pakistan, which can be associated with purchasing nuclear weapons from Pakistan.

Riyadh declared that it was following a nuclear power program without co-operation of other countries, and according to a royal command in April 2010: "The development of atomic energy is essential to meet the Kingdom's growing requirements for energy to generate electricity, produce desalinated water and reduce reliance on depleting hydrocarbon resources." KA-CARE has been set up in the capital of Saudi Arabia in order to progress this agenda which is considered as an alternative to oil, and also to be the proper agency for the purpose of treaties on nuclear energy signed by Saudi kingdom. Besides, it appointed the Finland- and Swiss-based Poyry consultancy company in order to assist define "high-level strategy in the area of nuclear and renewable energy applications" with desalination.

As well as this, the (South) Korea Atomic Energy Research Institute has signed an agreement with KA-CARE in March 2015 which is led to evaluate its potential to build two or more than two South Korean SMART reactors. Furthermore, in March/August 2017, the Saudi Arabia Geological Survey signed an agreement to a Chinese nuclear company (CNNC), and it was associated with co-operation on uranium exploration. CNNC mentioned that this will explore 9 potential areas for the resources of uranium in Saudi Arabia.

Nuclear weapons 
In 1988, the international community became suspicious of Saudi nuclear proliferation after it purchased 36 CSS-2 intermediate-range ballistic missiles from China during the Iran-Iraq War. After defecting to the United States in 1994, Saudi diplomat Mohammad al Khilewi claimed that Saudi Arabia started a nuclear weapons program chaired by Prince Sultan bin Abdulaziz following the Yom Kippur War and that it also financially and technologically assisted the Iraqi nuclear weapons program. After the 2003 U.S. invasion of Iraq The Guardian reported that Saudi Arabia renewed its interest in nuclear weapons, while in 2005 The New York Times claimed that U.S. President George W. Bush indicated to British Prime Minister Tony Blair that he was open to a preemptive invasion to prevent Saudi Arabia from acquiring nuclear weapons. 

The BBC reported using multiple sources that Saudi Arabia has funded nuclear weapons development in Pakistan, and the Saudi government believes that it is able to gain nuclear weapons at will. A senior NATO decision maker did mention that he personally viewed intelligence reports indicating that nuclear weapons which have been manufactured in Pakistan by the request of Riyadh, are ready for delivery. Saudi Arabia's foreign minister neither rejected nor confirmed the possibility of purchasing nuclear weapons.
Furthermore, Saudi royalty and other high-ranking officials have explicitly mentioned warnings in regards to their intention to obtain nuclear weapons if Iran were to come in possession of such weaponry. On March 15, 2018 Saudi defense minister and heir to the throne Prince Mohammad bin Salman made such a statement on the CBS 60 Minutes programme.

In 2019 the House Committee on Oversight and Reform in the United States reported that President Donald Trump planned to provide nuclear technology to Saudi Arabia in violation of the Atomic Energy Act. The reactors would be built by the company IP3 International, while negotiations were conducted by Jared Kushner and Energy Secretary Rick Perry. The report caused widespread condemnation from both Republican and Democratic lawmakers in both houses of Congress due in part to the recent assassination of Jamal Khashoggi and the conduct of the Saudi Arabian-led intervention in Yemen. In the Senate Ed Markey and Marco Rubio introduced a bill, the Saudi Nuclear Proliferation Act, to block the deal. Concerns were also directed about whether the deal would entail access to uranium enrichment technology. In response U.S. Deputy Energy Secretary Dan Brouillette claimed that Saudi Arabia would sign a Section 123 agreement restricting how Saudi Arabia could use nuclear technology.

Saudi Arabia has also shortlisted firms in Russia, China, France, and South Korea as sources of nuclear power.

On 17 September 2020, according to a confidential report compiled by the China National Nuclear Corporation (CNNC) and the Beijing Research Institute of Uranium Geology (BRIUG), as seen by The Guardian, Saudi Arabia was identified to have enough uranium ore reserves to begin domestic production of nuclear fuel. Saudi Arabia was found heading as another country in the Arab region, after the United Arab Emirates, to begin its own nuclear energy programme. Chinese data revealed that Saudi was capable of producing nearly 90,000 tonnes of uranium. Saudi Arabia was working with Chinese geologists in identifying the uranium deposits that were located in Saudi's northwestern region, where the Crown Prince Mohammed bin Salman was planning to build the Neom city. There were concerns, where Saudi was under suspicions of producing nuclear weapons, as it lacked transparency. Saudi Arabia followed the IAEA's Small Quantities Protocol regulations which did not allow direct inspections of Saudi nuclear facilities.

Nuclear weapons delivery 
According to the BBC, Saudi Arabian attempts to acquire ballistic missiles capable of fielding a nuclear warhead go back several decades. The Royal Saudi Strategic Missile Force possesses DF-3A (NATO: CSS-2) as a Chinese missile which is used in nuclear weapons delivery.
In fact, it is regarded as a Chinese liquid-fueled, single-stage, nuclear medium-range ballistic missile. Saudi Arabia bought several dozen (between 36 and 60) of this kind of missile from China in 1987. Riyadh displayed them in a parade in 2014, the first public viewing of the weapons.

Chemical and biological weapons 

Officially, Saudi Arabia is regarded as a party to both the Biological and Toxin Weapons Convention (BTWC), and also the Chemical Weapons Convention (CWC).

See also 

 Nuclear energy in Saudi Arabia
 Nuclear program of Saudi Arabia

References

External links 

Nuclear Power in Saudi Arabia, World Nuclear Association
 DF-3A / CSS-2, China sold several dozen outmoded DF-3 missiles to Saudi Arabia
 Campaigners warns of “toxic” UK arms deals with Saudi Arabia
 Saada's Governor: Saudi Arabia is Experimenting Toxic Weapons in Yemen's Saada

Saudi Arabia
Foreign relations of Saudi Arabia
Pakistan–Saudi Arabia relations
Military history of Saudi Arabia
Energy in Saudi Arabia
Politics of Saudi Arabia
Government of Saudi Arabia
Weapons of mass destruction by country